The Danlin-class cargo ship is a class of Chinese cargo ship that is in service with People's Liberation Army Navy (PLAN). Danlin-class cargo ships are the armed version of its unarmed sister ship in civilian service, and both entered service between 1960 – 1962. Specifications:
Displacement (t): 1290
Length (m): 60
Beam (m): 9
Draft (m): 4
Speed (kt): 14 kt
Propulsion: 750 hp Type 6DRN 30/50 diesel x 1
Armament: twin 37 mm gun x 1, twin 14.5 mm machine gun x 2
Radar: 1 former-USSR Fine Curve or Chinese Type 756 navigational radar
Crew: 35

Dandao class

The  Dandao class is the successor of earlier Danlin class, and it is an enlarged version of Danlin class. A total of seven ships were completed and entered service with PLAN in the late 1970s, three of which were built as coastal tanker versions.Although intended to be succeeded by Galați-class cargo ship, Dandao and Danlin class cargo ships remained active for a long time, serving alongside their successor. Specifications:
Displacement (t): 1600
Length (m): 65.7
Beam (m): 12.5
Draft (m): 4
Speed (kt): 12
Propulsion: 1 diesel engine
Armament: twin 37 mm x 4, twin 14.5 mm x 4
Radar: 1 former-USSR Fine Curve or Chinese Type 756 navigational radar
Crew: 40

References

Auxiliary transport ship classes
Auxiliary ships of the People's Liberation Army Navy